Gro Merete Brækken (born 8 December 1952) is a Norwegian businessperson.

Information
She was born in Narvik, and lived in Mo i Rana, Moss and Trondheim during her youth. She took her education at the Norwegian Institute of Technology, graduating in chemical engineering in 1975. She worked in Norske Shell from 1976 to 1982 and Statoil in Stavanger from 1982 to 1988. She was then chief executive officer of Ulstein International from 1988 to 1990, before working in Den norske Bank from 1991 to 1994. From 1994 to 1999 she was the vice president of the Confederation of Norwegian Enterprise. She was a representative and deputy chair of the International Gas Union between 1983 and 1988, deputy chair of Statkraft from 1991 to 1994 and board member of Kongsberg Gruppen from 1987 to 1997, the Norwegian Export Council from 1995 to 1999 and the Norwegian Refugee Council from 1997 to 1999. She was also chair in the Norwegian Refugee Council.

From 1999 to 2009 she was the secretary-general of Save the Children in Norway. On 1 January 2010 she became the new director of the Norwegian Oil Industry Association. She succeeded Per Terje Vold.

She resides in Snarøya.

References

1952 births
Living people
People in the petroleum industry
Equinor people
Ulstein Group people
Norwegian Institute of Technology alumni
People from Narvik
People from Rana, Norway
21st-century Norwegian businesswomen
21st-century Norwegian businesspeople
20th-century Norwegian businesswomen
20th-century Norwegian businesspeople